The 2015 Elimination Chamber (known as No Escape in Germany) was the sixth Elimination Chamber professional wrestling pay-per-view (PPV) and livestreaming event produced by WWE. The event was streamed exclusively on the WWE Network in the United States, marking the first Elimination Chamber to air on the WWE Network, and it was available on PPV in various territories outside the country. It took place on May 31, 2015, at the American Bank Center in Corpus Christi, Texas. It was the only edition of the event to be held in May; previous and future incarnations have taken place in February (except 2020, which was held in March). It was also the first event to include a tag team Elimination Chamber match. An Elimination Chamber event was not held in 2016, but it returned in 2017; in turn, it was the last Elimination Chamber event to be held before the reintroduction of the brand extension in July 2016.

Seven matches were contested at the event, including one match on the Kickoff pre-show. In the main event, Dean Ambrose defeated WWE World Heavyweight Champion Seth Rollins by disqualification. In other prominent matches on the undercard, Ryback defeated Dolph Ziggler, King Barrett, Mark Henry, R-Truth, and Sheamus in an Elimination Chamber match to win the vacant WWE Intercontinental Championship, NXT Champion Kevin Owens defeated WWE United States Champion John Cena in Owens' main roster debut match, which was a non-title match, and The New Day (Big E, Kofi Kingston, and Xavier Woods) defeated The Ascension (Konnor and Viktor), The Lucha Dragons (Kalisto and Sin Cara), Los Matadores (Diego and Fernando), The Prime Time Players (Darren Young and Titus O'Neil), and Tyson Kidd and Cesaro in a tag team Elimination Chamber match to retain the WWE Tag Team Championship.

Production

Background
Elimination Chamber is a gimmick pay-per-view (PPV) first produced by WWE in 2010. It was previously held annually in February. The concept of the show is that one or two main event matches are contested inside the Elimination Chamber, either with championships or future opportunities at championships at stake. The 2015 event was originally scheduled to be a house show, a wrestling show that is not televised, but it was announced during the May 11, 2015, episode of Raw that Elimination Chamber would return on May 31 and be held at the American Bank Center in Corpus Christi, Texas. The event was initially replaced in February by Fastlane because many arenas were not able to physically support the Elimination Chamber structure, thus making it easier to book the February pay-per-view event without the structure. WWE's other originally scheduled live event for May 31 in Greenville, South Carolina was canceled in order to bring the entire WWE roster to Corpus Christi, Texas, replaced by an upcoming episode of Raw in Greenville for November 16. The day after the 2014 event, WWE launched their online streaming service, the WWE Network, and it was announced that the 2015 Elimination Chamber would stream exclusively on the Network in the United States. However, it was made available on traditional PPV in other countries, including Bahrain, Egypt, and Germany.

In 2011 and since 2013, the show has been promoted as "No Escape" in Germany as it was feared that the name "Elimination Chamber" may remind people of the gas chambers used during the Holocaust.

Storylines
The card consisted of eight matches, including one on the Kickoff pre-show, that resulted from scripted storylines, where wrestlers portrayed heroes, villains, or less distinguishable characters in scripted events that built tension and culminated in a wrestling match or series of matches, with results predetermined by WWE's writers. Storylines between the characters played out on WWE's primary television programs, Raw and SmackDown.

On May 17, an Elimination Chamber match for the vacant Intercontinental Championship was scheduled for the event. On the May 18 episode of Raw, R-Truth, Sheamus, King Barrett, Ryback, Dolph Ziggler, and Rusev were added to the match. On May 31, Rusev was declared unable to compete because of an injury sustained three nights prior on SmackDown. Rusev was replaced by Mark Henry.

At Payback, The New Day defeated Tyson Kidd and Cesaro to retain the Tag Team Championship in a 2-out-of-3 falls Tag team match. Later in the event, The New Day were scheduled to defend the titles in a Tag team Elimination Chamber match at the event. On the May 18 episode of Raw, Kidd and Cesaro, Los Matadores, The Ascension, The Lucha Dragons, and The Prime Time Players were revealed as challengers.

On the May 18 episode of Raw, NXT Champion Kevin Owens answered United States Champion John Cena's weekly United States Championship Open Challenge. However, instead of fighting Cena, Owens attacked him, saying they would fight on his "own terms". Later in the night, Owens was granted a match to face Cena at the event.

On the May 18 episode of Raw, Dean Ambrose challenged WWE World Heavyweight Champion Seth Rollins to a title match but Rollins refused. Later in the night, Ambrose attacked Rollins until The Authority granted Ambrose a title match against Rollins at Elimination Chamber. On the last Raw before the event, The Authority tried to avoid the match by having Ambrose taken away from the arena in a police van before the official contract signing. However, Ambrose drove the van back into the arena and signed the contract for the match.

At Payback, Naomi and Tamina defeated The Bella Twins. After Nikki defeated Naomi by disqualification in a Divas Championship match on the May 18 episode of Raw, Paige returned from injury and attacked both contestants. On the May 21 episode of SmackDown, Naomi and Tamina attacked Paige before Nikki attacked Naomi, Tamina, and Paige. Nikki was then scheduled to defend the title against Paige and Naomi in a triple threat match at the event with Tamina banned from ringside.

On the May 18 episode of Raw, Bo Dallas confronted Neville during an interview and later, after Neville had lost a match to King Barrett, attacked Neville. On the May 25 episode of Raw, after Neville defeated Stardust, Dallas attacked Neville again. A match between the two was scheduled for the event.

On the May 25 episode of Raw, a special broadcast of "Miz TV" with Daniel Bryan as the special guest was set for the Kickoff pre-show.

Event

Pre-show
During the Elimination Chamber Kickoff pre-show, Stardust faced Zack Ryder. Stardust pinned Ryder after "The Queen's Crossbow" to win the match.

The Miz hosted an edition of "Miz TV", with Daniel Bryan as his guest. The Miz began to take credit for Bryan's accomplishments, which led to Bryan calling out The Meta Powers (Curtis Axel and Macho Mandow). The Meta Powers attacked The Miz to end the segment.

Preliminary matches
The actual pay-per-view opened with the Elimination Chamber tag team match for the WWE Tag Team Championship. The Ascension (Konnor and Viktor) entered at #1 whilst The Lucha Dragons (Kalisto and Sin Cara) entered at #2. Tyson Kidd and Cesaro entered at #3 and Los Matadores (Primo and Epico) entered at #4, along with their mascot El Torito. Los Matadores were eliminated by The Acension when Diego was pinned by Konnor after the "Fall of Man". The Lucha Dragons were eliminated by The Ascension when Kalisto was pinned by Konnor after the "Fall of Man". The Prime Time Players (Darren Young and Titus O'Neil) entered at #5 and eliminated The Ascension when Young pinned Viktor after a "Gut Check". The New Day (Big E, Kofi Kingston, and Xavier Woods) entered at #6. Cesaro and Kidd were eliminated by The Prime Time Players when Young pinned Cesaro with a schoolboy. The Prime Time Players were eliminated when O'Neil was pinned by Kingston after a "Trouble in Paradise", resulting in The New Day retaining the WWE Tag Team Championship.

Next, Nikki Bella defended the WWE Divas Championship against Paige and Naomi. Near the end of the match, Naomi performed an inverted frankensteiner on Paige for a near-fall and then attempted an enzuigiri on Nikki. Nikki countered into a "Rack Attack" to retain the title.

After that, NXT Champion Kevin Owens faced WWE United States Champion John Cena. Owens executed a pop-up powerbomb on Cena for a near-fall. Cena performed an "Attitude Adjustment" on Owens for a near-fall. Owens taunted and mocked Cena’s “you can’t see me” gesture, but Cena applied the STF, only for Owens to escape. Owens executed an "Attitude Adjustment" on Cena for a near-fall. Cena performed a clothesline on Owens and attempted another one, but Owens executed a second pop-up powerbomb on Cena to win the match.

In the fourth match, Neville faced Bo Dallas. At the end of the match, as Dallas attempted a "Bo-Dog", Neville countered into an enzuigiri on Dallas. Neville executed a "Red Arrow" on Dallas to win the match.

Next was the Elimination Chamber match for the vacant WWE Intercontinental Championship. King Barrett and Dolph Ziggler began the match as the first two participants. R-Truth entered at #3, and Mark Henry entered the match early at #4 after Barrett tackled Ziggler into Henry's Pod, breaking the Pod. Ryback entered at #5. Barrett was eliminated by R-Truth following a superkick from Ziggler, Snake eyes from Ryback and a "Lie Detector" from R-Truth. Sheamus entered at #6. R-Truth was eliminated by Ryback following "Shell Shocked". Henry was eliminated by Sheamus following a "Brogue Kick". Ziggler was eliminated by Sheamus following a "Brogue Kick". Ryback pinned Sheamus following "Shell Shocked", thus winning his first Intercontinental Championship and his first title in WWE overall.

Main event 
In the main event, Seth Rollins defended the WWE World Heavyweight Championship against Dean Ambrose. At the end of the match, Ambrose attempted a diving elbow drop, but Rollins pulled the referee in front of him who was knocked down. Rollins attempted a Phoenix splash, but Ambrose avoided it and pinned Rollins after a "Dirty Deeds", giving Ambrose the championship. However, the decision was changed to being Rollins being disqualified due to using the referee as a guard, so the championship didn't change hands. After the match, Rollins, Kane, Jamie Noble and Joey Mercury attacked Ambrose. Roman Reigns then appeared, attacking Rollins with a superman punch and threw the title belt to Ambrose. Reigns then fought off Kane with a spear and Noble and Mercury with superman punches. The event ended with Ambrose and Reigns leaving through the crowd with the championship.

Reception 
The event received generally mixed reviews. Jason Powell of "ProWrestling.net" found both Elimination Chamber matches "disappointing"; he called the first a "train wreck opener", and the second "flat". Mike Tedesco of Wrestleview.com thought the event was excellent, particularly the Owens vs. Cena match while also praising the Tag Team Elimination Chamber match. Nolan Howells of "Slam Sports" criticized the Intercontinental Championship Elimination Chamber match and gave it a negative score of 1.75 out of 5, but praised the John Cena vs. Kevin Owens match and gave it 4.5 out of 5. Howells gave the main event a 3 out of 5. He wrote "The world title match was a truly great match ruined by a truly awful finish. Predictable and put a whole set of nails in the coffin of an already dead crowd."

Aftermath 
After Dean Ambrose stole the WWE World Heavyweight Championship belt, on the following night's episode of Raw, The Authority demanded that Ambrose have a rematch with Rollins. Roman Reigns then appeared to tell them that Ambrose would be coming back with the belt only if Rollins was man enough for the title at Money in the Bank in a Ladder Match. Despite The Authority's objections, Rollins accepted the challenge. At Money in the Bank, Rollins won against Ambrose without any interference from The Authority.

Roman Reigns tried to get another shot at the WWE World Heavyweight Championship by qualifying in the Money in the Bank Ladder Match at Money in the Bank. Reigns became close to winning the match and the Money in the Bank contract until Bray Wyatt interfered and cost Reigns the match. This began a feud between Reigns and Wyatt that would last until Hell in a Cell where Reigns defeated Wyatt in a Hell in a Cell match.

This event is notable for being the final televised match for Tyson Kidd, as he suffered a career-ending neck injury during a live event match with Samoa Joe.

An Elimination Chamber event was not scheduled for 2016, however, the event was reinstated in 2017. Following the reintroduction of the brand split in July 2016, the 2017 event was held exclusively for wrestlers from the SmackDown brand. The 2017 event also returned Elimination Chamber to its regular February slot with Fastlane moving to the March slot. The only exception to this was the 2020 event that was held in March due to Super ShowDown being held in February that year; a Fastlane event did not occur in 2020.

Results

Tag Team Championship Elimination Chamber details

Intercontinental Championship Elimination Chamber details

Notes

References

External links 
 
 https://www.inquirer.com/philly/blogs/the-squared-circle/WWE-Elimination-Chamber-2015-Results-and-observations-from-the-show.html

Events in Texas
Professional wrestling in Texas
2015
2015 in Texas
2015 WWE Network events
2015 WWE pay-per-view events
May 2015 events in the United States